The 1964 Australian Championships was a tennis tournament that took place on outdoor grass courts at the Milton Courts in Brisbane, Australia from 4 January to 13 January. It was the 52nd edition of the Australian Championships (now known as the Australian Open), the 6th held in Brisbane, and the first Grand Slam tournament of the year. The singles titles were won by Australians Roy Emerson and Margaret Smith.

Champions

Men's singles

 Roy Emerson defeated  Fred Stolle  6–3, 6–4, 6–2

Women's singles

 Margaret Smith defeated  Lesley Turner 6–3, 6–2

Men's doubles
 Bob Hewitt /  Fred Stolle defeated  Roy Emerson /  Ken Fletcher 6–4, 7–5, 3–6, 4–6, 14–12

Women's doubles
 Judy Tegart /  Lesley Turner defeated  Robyn Ebbern /   Margaret Smith 6–4, 6–4

Mixed doubles
 Margaret Smith /  Ken Fletcher defeated  Jan Lehane /  Mike Sangster 6–3, 6–2

References

External links
 Australian Open official website

Australian Championships
Australian Championships (tennis) by year
January 1964 sports events in Australia
1960s in Brisbane
Sports competitions in Brisbane
Tennis in Queensland